The 2010–11 Fort Wayne Komets season was the first season in the Central Hockey League of the CHL franchise in Fort Wayne, Indiana.

Regular season

Conference standings

Awards and records

Awards

Milestones

Transactions
The Komets have been involved in the following transactions during the 2010–11 season.

Roster

Affiliates
NHL - Columbus Blue Jackets
AHL - Springfield Falcons

See also
 2010–11 CHL season

References

External links
 2010–11 Fort Wayne Komets season at Pointstreak

F
F